Utah Royals FC is an American women's professional soccer club based in the Salt Lake City suburb of Sandy, Utah. Established on November 16, 2017, as an expansion club, the Royals played its first stint in the National Women's Soccer League (NWSL) from 2018 to 2020.

On December 7, 2020, the NWSL announced that the Royals would cease operations and their player-related assets transferred to the expansion Kansas City NWSL team, now known as the Kansas City Current. However, the new owners of Utah Soccer LLC (after Dell Loy Hansen) reserved the option of bringing back the club, and the team's re-establishment was announced in March 2023 in preparation for the 2024 season.

History

Establishment

On November 16, 2017, Real Salt Lake of Major League Soccer announced that it had acquired a franchise in the National Women's Soccer League. On November 20, 2017, the league announced that FC Kansas City of the National Women's Soccer League would fold their club, and the team's player contracts, draft picks, and other rights would be transferred to the new Salt Lake City club. , Utah's six NCAA Division I women's soccer teams outnumbered the men's, a seventh women's soccer school moved from Division II to Division I in 2020, and the state has the highest rate of girls' high school soccer players recruited by Division I colleges. Attendance at Division I women's soccer games in Utah is among the highest in the NCAA. The decision to bring a NWSL team to Utah was based on the established interest in men's  soccer in the state as well as Dell Loy Hansen's gut feeling and longtime interest in a team.

The new Salt Lake City team announced its hiring of former Seattle Reign FC coach Laura Harvey as its inaugural head coach on November 27, 2017.

Inaugural season

Gunnhildur Yrsa Jónsdóttir scored the first goal in franchise history on March 24, 2018 in the third minute of the club's inaugural match against Orlando Pride in Orlando. 18,500 tickets were sold  ahead of their first home match (with only club seats and standing-only tickets remaining). Official attendance the day of the match, in which they played the Chicago Red Stars, was reported as 19,203.

Colors and badge

The team was officially launched on December 1, 2017 with the announcements of its name, branding, season tickets, and social media. The badge features a gold Lioness head and “Claret Red”, “Cobalt Blue” and “Victory Gold” colors. Two stylized balls surround the name “UTAH ROYALS FC” in the lower half of the badge which represent the team's connection to the organization's MLS and United Soccer League teams. Rio Tinto Stadium, now known as America First Field, was named as the team's playing ground. By the end of December 2017 over 2,000 season tickets had been sold. By early April 2018, the number of season tickets sold had increased to 5,000.

Sponsorship
In February 2018, the Royals announced a three-year multimillion-dollar deal with Conservice, a utility company based in Logan, Utah. The company's logo is featured on the front of the team's jerseys. Utah announced a multi-year partnership deal with Young Living Essential Oils on April 2, 2019. The Young Living partnership will include an original video series called ‘Rise up to Royalty’ which profiles URFC players personal lives. This 12-episode series, will run throughout the course of the 2019 season.

Stadium
Utah Royals FC play at America First Field (known before September 2022 as Rio Tinto Stadium), located 15 minutes from downtown Salt Lake City in Sandy, Utah, as the men's team, Real Salt Lake, does. America First Field is a soccer-specific stadium which opened on October 9, 2008. The pitch features Kentucky Bluegrass and is 120 × 75 yards. The stadiums seats 20,213 for soccer matches.

Players and coaches

Current squad

Technical staff

Records

Season-by-season

Head coaches record

Broadcasting

The Utah Royals announced that all matches in 2018, except for their six NWSL Game of the Week appearances on Lifetime, would be broadcast locally on KMYU My Utah TV and streamed on the KSL app, as an extension of the broadcast rights agreements with Sinclair Broadcast Group and KSL with Real Salt Lake. KALL ESPN 700 would carry the majority of Royals games on local radio – as it does for Real Salt Lake and Real Monarchs. On August 17, 2018, KSL announced that Utah Royals games would no longer be broadcast on television or radio, but they would continue to be streamed on the KSL website and app.

See also
 List of top-division football clubs in CONCACAF countries
 List of professional sports teams in the United States and Canada
 Real Salt Lake Women

References

External links

 

 
Soccer clubs in Salt Lake City
Women's soccer clubs in the United States
Association football clubs established in 2017
2017 establishments in Utah
Soccer clubs in Utah
National Women's Soccer League teams